The 1967–68 Rugby Football League season was the 73rd season of rugby league football.

Season summary

Leeds had ended the regular season as league leaders for the second successive season.
Wakefield Trinity won their second Championship, the second in successive seasons, when they beat Hull Kingston Rovers 17-10 in the Championship Final. Gary Cooper was awarded the Harry Sunderland Trophy as man-of-the-match.

The Challenge Cup winners were Leeds who beat Wakefield Trinity 11-10 in the final.

The BBC2 Floodlit Trophy winners were Castleford who beat Leigh 8-5 in the final.

Clive Sullivan of Hull F.C. set a club record of 7-tries scored in a match against Doncaster on 15 April 1968.

Warrington won the Lancashire League, and Leeds won the Yorkshire League. St. Helens beat Warrington 2–2 (replay 13–10) to win the Lancashire County Cup, and Hull Kingston Rovers beat Hull F.C. 8–7 to win the Yorkshire County Cup.

Championship

Play-offs

Challenge Cup

Leeds beat Wakefield 11-10 in the final played at Wembley in front of a crowd of 87,100. This was Leeds’ ninth Cup Final win in eleven Final appearances. The Leeds winning team coached by Roy Francis was; Bev Risman, Alan Smith, Syd Hynes, Bernard Watson, John Atkinson, Mick Shoebottom, Barry Seabourne, Mick Clark (c), Tony Crosby, Ken Eyre, Bill Ramsey, Albert Eyre, Ray Batten subs: John Langley, Mick Joyce.

Dubbed the "Watersplash Final", this match was remembered for the atrocious pitch conditions caused by a torrential downpour that left many large puddles on the playing surface. The conditions contributed to a nail biting finale. Leeds had taken an 11-7 lead with a minute to go, but Wakefield scored a try next to the posts from the kick-off. Don Fox had only to convert to win the Final, but pushed it wide of the posts.

Operational rules
The playing of matches on Sundays was sanctioned for the first time in December 1967. This change was made to avoid competition from association football clubs.

Kangaroo Tour

From September until December also saw the appearance of the Australian team in England on their 1967–68 Kangaroo Tour. Other than the three test Ashes series against Great Britain (won 2–1 by Australia), The Kangaroos played matches against club and county representative sides

The 1967–68 Kangaroos were captain-coached by champion St George Dragons centre Reg Gasnier who was making his third tour following from 1959–60 and 1967–68. While his team achieved success, the tour was a tragedy for Gasnier. He broke his leg during the first test at Headingley that saw him sit out the remainder of the English leg. He returned to the field in France but in a minor game against Les Espoirs in Avignon, he suffered a further break. This would ultimately cause him to announce his retirement from playing at the age of just 28. He later told in an interview that he never regretted his decision to retire, explaining that he had been playing rugby league virtually non-stop including juniors, junior representative games, the Sydney premiership, interstate games and international tours since the early 1950s, and felt it was about time that he started devoting more time to his family.

References

Sources
1967-68 Rugby Football League season at wigan.rlfans.com
The Challenge Cup at The Rugby Football League website

1967 in English rugby league
1968 in English rugby league
Northern Rugby Football League seasons